The following elections occurred in the year 1944.

Asia
 1943–1944 Iranian legislative election

Europe
 1944 Icelandic constitutional referendum
 1944 Irish general election
 1944 Swedish general election

United Kingdom
 1944 Berwick-upon-Tweed by-election
 1944 Camberwell North by-election
 1944 Chelsea by-election

North America

Canada
 1944 Alberta general election
 1944 Edmonton municipal election
 1944 New Brunswick general election
 1944 Ottawa municipal election
 1944 Quebec general election
 1944 Saskatchewan general election
 1944 Toronto municipal election
 1944 Yukon general election

United States
 1944 United States elections
 1944 United States presidential election
 United States House of Representatives elections in California, 1944
 1944 Louisiana gubernatorial election
 1944 Maine gubernatorial election
 1944 Minnesota gubernatorial election
 1944 New York state election
 United States House of Representatives elections in South Carolina, 1944
 United States Senate election in South Carolina, 1944
 1944 United States House of Representatives elections

United States Senate
 1944 United States Senate elections
 United States Senate special election in Massachusetts, 1944

South America
 1944 Salvadoran Constitutional Assembly election
 1944 Salvadoran presidential election

Guatemala
 1944 Guatemalan Constitutional Assembly election
 December 1944 Guatemalan Presidential election
 1944 Guatemalan general election
 November 1944 Guatemalan parliamentary election
 October 1944 Guatemalan parliamentary election
 July 1944 Guatemalan presidential election

Oceania

Australia
 1944 New South Wales state election
 1944 Queensland state election
 1944 Australian referendum
 1944 South Australian state election

See also
 :Category:1944 elections

1944
Elections